Séverine Ferrer (born 31 October 1977) is a French singer.

Biography
Ferrer was born in Montpellier and grew up on the island of Réunion. In 1991, Ferrer and her family moved to Paris. She began her career by appearing in television series. In 2004, Ferrer released a new album and a clothing line for pregnant women. Ferrer represented the principality of Monaco with the song "La coco-dance", at the Eurovision Song Contest 2006 but failed to pass through the semi-finals.

See also
 Monaco in the Eurovision Song Contest 2006

External links 
 Eurovision Website – Monegasque Page

1977 births
Living people
Musicians from Montpellier
Eurovision Song Contest entrants for Monaco
Eurovision Song Contest entrants of 2006
Ferrer, Severine
21st-century French singers
21st-century French women singers
French people of Indian descent
People of Norman descent
French people of Italian descent
French people of Vietnamese descent